Qotlu (also Romanized as Qoţlū) is a village in Baranduzchay-ye Shomali Rural District, in the Central District of Urmia County, West Azerbaijan Province, Iran. At the 2006 census, its population was 716, in 195 families.

References 

Populated places in Urmia County